David M. Ishee (born 1963) is an associate justice of the Supreme Court of Mississippi.

Biography

Ishee was born in Gulfport, Mississippi, in 1963. He received his Bachelor of Science from the University of Southern Mississippi in 1985 and his Juris Doctor from the University of Mississippi School of Law after studying at the University of London.

After graduation he entered private law practice with his late father-in-law, Elmo Lang of Pascagoula, Mississippi.  He  practiced for almost 14 years in the law firm of Lang and Ishee.  During that time, he was involved in extensive litigation in civil, criminal, and domestic-relations law.

State court service
In 1993, at the age of 29, he was appointed Municipal Court Judge for the City of Pascagoula. He was the youngest Municipal Court judge in the state of Mississippi.  He was re-appointed for a second term in 1996.  During this time, he also served one year as interim Municipal Court Judge for the City of Ocean Springs, and was Judge Pro Tem for the Jackson County Youth Court. Upon returning to Gulfport, Ishee was appointed Municipal Court Judge for the City of Gulfport in October 1999.  He joined the law firm of Franke, Rainey and Salloum, PLLC, in 2002.  He also served for two years as adjunct professor at Mississippi Gulf Coast Community College, teaching torts and personal injury law. In April 2004, Ishee was appointed Senior Municipal Court Judge for the City of Gulfport.

Service on Mississippi Court of Appeals
In September 2004, Ishee was appointed to the Mississippi Court of Appeals by then Governor Haley Barbour.  He was  appointed by the chief justice of the Mississippi Supreme Court to chair the Criminal Section of the Model Jury Instructions Revision Committee, which revised the Criminal Model Jury Instructions for the Circuit Courts of Mississippi.

Service on Supreme Court of Mississippi
Ishee was appointed to the Mississippi Supreme Court by Governor Phil Bryant to replace former Justice Jess H. Dickinson. He took the oath of office on September 18, 2017.

Personal
He is married to the former Linda Lang of Pascagoula. They have one daughter, Lauren. Justice Ishee is the son of Mrs. Doris Ishee of Gulfport and the late Representative Roger Ishee.

References

External links
Official Biography on Mississippi Supreme Court website

Living people
1963 births
Mississippi Court of Appeals judges
Mississippi lawyers
Mississippi state court judges
Justices of the Mississippi Supreme Court
People from Gulfport, Mississippi
University of Mississippi School of Law alumni
University of Southern Mississippi alumni
21st-century American judges